The 2008 Welsh Open was a professional ranking snooker tournament that took place between 11 and 17 February 2008 in the Newport Centre in Newport, Wales.

Neil Robertson was the defending champion, but he lost his last 16 match against Ali Carter. Mark Selby won his first ranking title by defeating Ronnie O'Sullivan 9–8, after coming back from 5–8 down.


Notable happenings 
 Tian Pengfei won the last 3 frames to oust one of the Welsh favourites, Matthew Stevens 5–4.
 David Roe led John Higgins 3–1 before losing 3–5.
 Mark Williams won the last 3 frames to beat Marco Fu 5–4.
 Ali Carter led Neil Robertson 4–0 but won only 5–3.
 Ronnie O'Sullivan won the high break prize with a 143 in the last frame of his 6–3 semi-final victory over Shaun Murphy, surpassing an effort of 134 from Marcus Campbell.
 Mark Selby had a highest break of 77 in the final compared to O'Sullivan's 135.

Prize fund 
The breakdown of prize money for this year is shown below: 

Winner: £35,000
Runner Up: £17,500
Semi Finalists: £8,750
Quarter Finalist: £6,500
Last 16: £4,275
Last 32: £2,750
Last 48: £1,725
Last 64: £1,325

Stage one highest break: £500
Stage two highest break: £2,000

Stage one maximum break: £1,000
Stage two maximum break: £20,000

Total: £225,500

Main draw

Top half

Bottom half

Final

Qualifying 
Qualifying for the tournament took place at Pontin's in Prestatyn, Wales  between 26 January and 28 January 2008.

Century breaks

Main stage centuries 

143, 135, 113, 108, 105, 101  Ronnie O'Sullivan
134  Marcus Campbell
133  Ken Doherty
132, 115, 108, 107  Joe Perry
130, 124  Stephen Hendry
129, 108, 105  Shaun Murphy
125, 114  John Higgins
123, 112  Judd Trump
123  Stuart Bingham
117, 101  Marco Fu
115  Ding Junhui

114, 101  Mark Selby
114, 100  Mark Williams
112  Michael Judge
109  Stephen Maguire
107  Jamie Cope
107  Andrew Higginson
105, 102  Ali Carter
103  Dave Harold
102  Rod Lawler
100  Anthony Hamilton
100  Neil Robertson

Qualifying stage centuries 

134  Stuart Pettman
128  Munraj Pal
126  Judd Trump
123  Tony Drago
122  Liang Wenbo
113  Issara Kachaiwong

112  Ian Preece
109  Tom Ford
105  David Roe
104  Jimmy Michie
100  Lee Walker

References 

Welsh Open (snooker)
Welsh Open
Open (snooker)
Welsh Open snooker in Newport